The name Dunrobin was given to two Scottish steam locomotives.

When the Far North Line opened to Golspie in 1871, the 3rd Duke of Sutherland had purchased a small  from Kitson and Company for his private train. Named Dunrobin, it had  driving wheels,  outside cylinders, and weighed 21 tons in working order. On his succession, the 4th Duke decided to have a new locomotive built, and the original Dunrobin was sold to the Highland Railway in 1895. It was rebuilt in 1896 with a larger boiler and cylinders. The Highland Railway numbered it 118 and named it Gordon Castle for use on the Fochabers branch. Later it was renamed Invergordon and used as a shunter in that town, where it survived until just after the Grouping.

The new Dunrobin

The new Dunrobin was an  built by Sharp, Stewart & Co. (works no. 4085) in 1895 for the 4th Duke of Sutherland. It had  driving wheels and  inside cylinders. The original Dunrobin was a  built by Kitson & Co., Leeds for the 3rd Duke of Sutherland. It was replaced in 1895 by the new locomotive. Two railway carriages were constructed, which Dunrobin hauled to Inverness and were then attached to Highland Railway trains to convey the Duke to his destination. The carriages were a bogie saloon and a four-wheel saloon.

Preservation
In 1949, British Railways, Scottish Region revoked the Duke's running powers. He then sold the locomotive and coaches. The bogie saloon is now part of the National Railway Museum's collection. As of January 2011 it is under the care of the Scottish Railway Preservation Society at the Bo'ness and Kinneil Railway. Following Howey's death in 1963, the locomotive and carriage were sold to Harold Foster, who had them transported to Canada. Foster was declared bankrupt in 1965, and the locomotive and carriage were bought for $15,000 by the Government of British Columbia. They became exhibits at Fort Steele heritage village, where Dunrobin was steamed occasionally. It was last steamed at Fort Steele in 2005. In 2010, both were declared surplus to requirements.

It was announced in January 2011 that they had been bought by Beamish Museum, with the intention of restoring Dunrobin to working order. The locomotive and carriage arrived back in the United Kingdom on 16 May. The carriage was taken to Beamish. The Highland Railway W Class were near-clones of Dunrobin.

References

2-4-0T locomotives
0-4-4T locomotives
Kitson locomotives
Sharp Stewart locomotives
Steam locomotives of Great Britain
Passenger locomotives